Macon is an unincorporated community in Fayette County, Tennessee, United States. The community is located at the intersection of two state highways, State Route 193 (Macon Road) and State Route 194 (Oakland Road going north and Rossville Road going south). Its ZIP Code is 38048.

The Mebane-Nuckolls House in Macon is listed on the National Register of Historic Places.

References

Unincorporated communities in Tennessee
Unincorporated communities in Fayette County, Tennessee